Tateno Station is the name of two train stations in Japan:

 Tateno Station (Kumamoto)
 Tateno Station (Saga)